A faggot, in the meaning of "bundle", is an archaic English unit applied to bundles of certain items. Alternate spellings in Early Modern English include fagate, faget, fagett, faggott, fagot, fagatt, fagott, ffagott, and faggat. A similar term is found in other languages (e.g. Latin: fascis).

Background
The measurement was standardised in ordinances by 1474. A small short faggot was also called a nicket. A brush-faggot (sometimes shortened to brush) was a bundle of similar size made of brushwood.

In a book on slang used at Winchester College fire-dogs were fire basket (andirons) that could hold long faggots, and half-faggots were smaller andirons that could only hold short faggots and were later converted for use with coal.

A long faggot was also called a kidd faggot, kid, kide, or kidde being Middle English for firewood in bundles.

A faggot was also a unit of weight used to measure iron or steel rods or bars totaling .

See also
 Stere
 Fasces

References

External links 
 
 

Obsolete units of measurement